Ospadal Uibhist agus Bharraigh (Uist and Barra Hospital) is a community hospital in Benbecula which provides services on the islands of North Uist, South Uist and Benbecula in the Western Isles of Scotland. It is managed by NHS Western Isles.

History
The hospital, which replaced a 21-bed hospital in Daliburgh and a 25-bed care of the elderly hospital in Lochmaddy, opened in 2001. In 2008 a £500,000 endoscopy suite opened.

In December 2014, NHS Western Isles announced plans to close three dental surgeries which need renovation on the Uists and move the services to the hospital. At the same time, the board proposed decreasing the number of staffed beds from 29 to 16.

Services
The hospital has 29 beds, and provides care of the elderly, GP Acute and Midwifery led maternity services.

References

External links
 

Hospital buildings completed in 2001
NHS Western Isles
Hospitals in the Outer Hebrides
Benbecula
NHS Scotland hospitals